The 1892 Montana gubernatorial election was held on November 8, 1892.

Republican nominee John E. Rickards defeated Democratic nominee Timothy E. Collins and Populist nominee William Kennedy with 41.17% of the vote.

General election

Candidates
Major party candidates
Timothy E. Collins, Democratic, former member of the Montana territorial legislative assembly
John E. Rickards, Republican, incumbent Lieutenant Governor of Montana

Other candidates
William Kennedy, People's, newspaper editor
J. M. Waters, Prohibition

Results

References

Bibliography
 
 
 

1892
Montana
Gubernatorial